Vagabonds Act may refer to:

 Vagabonds Act 1383 (7 Ric. II c. 5), Act of the Parliament of England under Richard II
 Vagabonds Act 1530 (22 Hen. VIII c.12), Act of the Parliament of England, a part of Henry VIII's "Tudor Poor Laws"
 Vagabonds Act 1547 (1 Edw. VI c. 3), Act of the Parliament of England under Edward VI
 Vagabonds Act 1572 (14 Eliz. I c. 5), Act of the Parliament of England, a part of Elizabeth I's "Tudor Poor Laws"
 Vagabonds Act 1597 (39 Eliz. I c.3), Act of the Parliament of England, a part of Elizabeth I's "Tudor Poor Laws"

See also
 Statute of Cambridge 1388 (12 Rich.II c.7), Act of the Parliament of England under Richard II
 Vagabonds and Beggars Act 1494 (11 Henry VII c.2), Act of the Parliament of England under Henry VII
 Tudor Poor Laws, through the Tudor era (1485–1603)
 Act for Punishment of Sturdy Vagabonds and Beggars 1536 (27 Hen VIII c. 25), Act of the Parliament of England, a part of Henry VIII's "Tudor Poor Laws"
 Act for the Relief of the Poor 1601 (43 Eliz. 1 c. 2), Act of the Parliament of England under Elizabeth I, the "Elizabethan Poor Law"
 Pedlars Act 1871 (34 and 35 Vict. c. 96), Act of the Parliament of the United Kingdom under Queen Victoria
 Prevention of Crimes Act 1871 (34 and 35 Vict. c. 112), Act of the Parliament of the United Kingdom under Queen Victoria
 Penal Servitude Act 1891 (54 & 55 Vict. c. 69), Act of the Parliament of the United Kingdom under Queen Victoria
 Vagrancy Act (disambiguation)